Molten Ventures, formerly Draper Esprit, is a venture capital firm, investing in high growth technology companies with global ambitions, with offices in London, Cambridge and Dublin. It is listed on the London Stock Exchange and is a constituent of the FTSE 250 Index.

History
Founded in 2006 as Esprit Capital, the company was renamed Draper Esprit in 2015 after joining Silicon Valley investor Tim Draper and the Draper Venture Network.

In June 2016, Draper Esprit was the subject of an initial public offering on the London Stock Exchange. It moved to the main market in July 2021 becoming the largest technology-related venture capital company to be publicly listed.

In November 2021, Draper Esprit rebranded to Molten Ventures.

In April 2022, Molten Ventures joined The Venture Capital Trust Association (VCTA).

Investments
Investments have included companies such as Crowdcube, Endomag, Freetrade, Graphcore, Revolut and Trustpilot.

References

External links
 

Venture capital firms of the United Kingdom
Venture capital firms of Ireland
Financial services companies established in 2006
Companies listed on the London Stock Exchange